The Transport (Compliance and Miscellaneous) Act 1983 (the Act) is a prime statute regulating transport activities in the State of Victoria, Australia.  Key areas regulated by the statute currently include taxi and hire car services and compliance and enforcement, particularly in areas like safety and public transport ticketing and conduct.

The Act was once the leading transport statute in Victoria but this is no longer the case as that position has been taken by the Transport Integration Act.  Nonetheless, the Transport (Compliance and Integration) Act remains a key transport statute in Victoria particularly in a support capacity to the Transport Integration Act and to safety scheme and other statutes.

Short history 

The Transport (Compliance and Miscellaneous) Act was initially enacted as the Transport Act 1983 which until June 2010 was the principal land transport statute in Victoria.

The Transport Act initially established the main land transport organisations in Victoria following major institutional reform in the Victorian transport portfolio in the early 1980s. The Transport Act also contained the key land transport regulatory schemes. However, the development and enactment of the Transport Integration Act 2010 eventually led to that statute becoming the principal transport statute in Victoria, relegating the Transport Act to a secondary role.

In effect, the major reform activity of the then Victorian Government's Transport Legislation Review led to substantial changes in the directions and style of Victoria's transport policy and legislation.  The Transport Integration Act developed by the Review effectively removed the organisational establishment parts from the Transport Act as Victoria's transport agencies were re-established and reformed with cleaner and newer charters under the Integration Act. In addition, the Transport Act was progressively stripped of many of its substantive transport regulation schemes over many years from the mid-1990s to around 2010 due to the development and enactment of a range of stand alone transport regulation statutes, many of them under the auspices of the Transport Legislation Review.

These two factors combined and the fact that the Transport Act had, unlike the Transport Integration Act, never applied to ports and marine activities and effectively stripped the Transport Act of its pre-eminence.

Position in transport legislation hierarchy 
Today, the Transport (Compliance and Miscellaneous) Act largely operates as a support statute in the hierarchy of Victorian transport statutes. It forms part of the transport policy and legislation framework in Victoria headed by the Transport Integration Act.  As a result, the application of the Transport (Compliance and Miscellaneous) Act is subject to the overarching transport system vision, transport system objectives and decision making principles in the Transport Integration Act.

Act content 
The content of the Transport (Compliance and Miscellaneous) Act consists of the following -

Part 1 - Preliminary 
This Part contains some formal provisions covering title, commencement and definitions.  It also confirms that the Act is transport legislation for the purposes of the Transport Integration Act.

Part 2 - Administration 
The Act no longer contains provisions which establish transport agencies.  Part 2 of the Act, on the other hand, contains a number of provisions which empower or relate to agencies established under the Transport Integration Act.  For example, the Part contains powers able to be exercised by the Director of Public Transport such as powers relating to use and modification of infrastructure.  In addition, the Part contains a number of important financial provisions such as the establishment and operation of the Public Transport Fund.

Part 3 - Powers of the Corporation 
Part 3 of the Act contains few provisions.  Those that remain though are important and concern land acquisition and development for the City Loop, regulation making powers and related provisions.

Part 4 - Financial 
Most of Part 4 has been repealed by other statutes.  It does, however, contain a provision about financial guarantees.

Part 5 - Chief Investigator, Transport and Marine Safety Investigations 
Part 5 contains a number of substantive provisions relating to the Chief Investigator, Transport Safety.  Included in the Part are special investigation powers for the Chief Investigator, provisions relating to the compilation and issue of reports and a range of miscellaneous provisions concerning gathering and use of information.

Part 6 - Licensing of Certain Vehicles and Driver Accreditation 
Part 6 of the Act containing provisions relating to the taxi industry and other small commercial passenger vehicles including hire cars and special purpose vehicles.  The Part represents an anomaly in the structure of Victorian transport legislation as other major transport industries in the State are regulated by special purpose statutes.

The provisions in the Part are extensive.  They require the licensing of taxis and other small commercial passenger vehicles.  Requirements are included concerning the mandatory accreditation of taxi industry participants including licence holders,  operators and networks.  This Part also provides for the accreditation of drivers of taxis, hire cars and buses and, at odds with the rest of the Part, provisions relating to requirements for the preparation of transport plans where special public or private events affect the operation of transport services. Finally, the Act contains a range of inquiry-related provisions which support the activities of the Taxi Services Commission as part of the Victorian Government's current Taxi Industry Inquiry.

Part 7 - Prosecutions, Enforcement and Penalties and Other Matters 
Part 7 contains a range of provisions which predominantly concern the enforcement of transport offences.  Provision is made for the issue of transport infringements for transport offences but also provides for various powers including name and address and arrest powers.  The Part also sets out a number of offences including in relation to dishonesty.

The Part also contains a number of schemes relating to public transport enforcement.  For example, it requires the authorisation of persons who conduct ticketing and conduct enforcement activities on Victoria's train, tram and bus networks.  In addition, the Part sets out an enforcement accreditation scheme for passenger transport companies which must be accredited by the Department of Transport before being able to employ or engage authorised officers.  The part also contains a number of specific transport offences relating to dangerous conduct or conduct affecting amenity on public transport.

The final divisions in Part 7 make provision to support public transport safety schemes administered by the Director, Transport Safety for the rail and bus sectors.  The provisions provide for the appointment and powers of transport safety officers including by establishing inspection and search and seizure powers.  Also included in this area of the Part are a range of provisions conferring power to issue sanctions on the Director, Transport Safety and the courts in respect of breaches of transport safety laws.  Sanctions include improvement notices, prohibition notices, enforceable undertakings commercial benefits penalties and exclusion orders.

Part 8 - Miscellaneous and transitional 
Consistent with its title, Part 8 sets out a range of miscellaneous and transitional provisions including those relating to the abolition of former transport agencies, service of documents, rail noise, provisions relating to tourist railways, transfer of staff and other sundry matters.  A range of detailed transitional provisions were recently added to this Part as a result of the establishment of the Taxi Services Commission and the positioning of the Secretary of the Department of Transport as Victoria's current taxi and small commercial passenger vehicle regulator.

Schedules 
Nine of the twelve schedules to the Act have been repealed.  Only one is likely to have substantive effect and relates to taxi industry assignments.

See also 

 Transport Act 1983
 Transport Integration Act

References 

Transport in Victoria (Australia)
Victoria (Australia) legislation
Transport law in Australia
1983 in Australian law
1980s in Victoria (Australia)
History of transport in Victoria (Australia)
1983 in transport
Transport legislation